Villafrati is a comune (municipality) in the Metropolitan City of Palermo in the Italian region Sicily, located about  southeast of Palermo.

Villafrati borders the following municipalities: Baucina, Bolognetta, Cefalà Diana, Ciminna, Marineo, Mezzojuso.

Demographic evolution

References

Municipalities of the Metropolitan City of Palermo